John Carroll Catholic High School may refer to:

 John Carroll Catholic High School (Birmingham, Alabama)
 John Carroll Catholic High School (Fort Pierce, Florida)
 The John Carroll School (Bel Air, Maryland)

See also
 Archbishop Carroll High School (disambiguation)